"Web of Night" is a single by Japanese vocalist T.M.Revolution. It is one of two exclusive songs from the Japanese release of the Spider-Man 2 soundtrack. The song was released on July 28, 2004 Sony Music for the Japanese market only.

Single information 
This single includes both English and Japanese versions of the song as well as the orchestrated track Tears Macerate Reason. Despite the fact that Web of Night has not been released commercially in the U.S., the song has been performed by T.M.Revolution both in Baltimore at OTAKON2003 and in Anaheim Pacific Media Expo in 2004.

Track list 
"Web of Night"
"Tears Macerate Reason" (Dedicated to Spiderman2)
"Web of Night" (English Version)

2004 songs
Spider-Man (2002 film series)
Songs from Spider-Man films